Bikram Bir Thapa (also called Vikramveer Thapa; 22 February 1948) is an Indian painter and Nepali language writer, best known for his short stories. In 1999, he won the Sahitya Akademi Award for Nepali language for his work Bishaun Shatabdi Ki Monalisa.

Early life 
Bikram Bir Thapa was born on 22 February 1948 in Shillong, Meghalaya to father Raghuvir Thapa and mother Kaushalya Devi. His father was a retired Gurkha Subedar who passed away when Thapa was 4 years old. On 16 May 1968, he joined the Indian Army in the infantry regiment of 5th Gorkha Rifles (Frontier Force) and participated in the Bangladesh Liberation War.

Career 
He first published his first story in 1969, called Communist in the Tarun newspaper from Shillong. In 1983, Thapa published romantic novel, Bigatko Parivesh Bhitra, set in his hometown. His Teestadekhi Sutlejsamma deals with the identity crisis of the Indian Gorkhas. 

In 1999, he was awarded the prestigious Sahitya Akademi Award for Nepali language for his work Bishaun Shatabdi Ki Monalisa. Bikram Bir Thapa Library School is one of the earliest Nepali-language school in Meghalaya, which is named after him.

Publications 

 Communist, 1969 
 Upahar, 1973/74
 Bigatko Parivesh Bhitra, novel, 1983
 Teestadekhi Sutlejsamma, novel, 1986
 Hatya: Rato Dairyko, 1994
 Bishaun Shatabdi Ki Monalisa, 1997
 Mato Boldo Ho, novel, 2007
 Manisingh Gurung, biography, 2010
 Kargil Yuddha, autobiography, 2016

Awards 

 Sahitya Akademi Award (1999) for Bishaun Shatabdi Ki Monalisa
 Kanchenjunga National Award by Nepali Sahitya Parishad Sikkim

See also
 List of Sahitya Akademi Award winners for Nepali

References 

1948 births
People from Shillong
Indian male short story writers
Indian novelists
Recipients of the Sahitya Akademi Award in Nepali
Nepali-language writers from India
Indian Gorkhas